Following are the results of the 2010–11 Serbian League Vojvodina season.  The Serbian League Vojvodina is a section of the Serbian League, Serbia's third football league. Teams from Vojvodina are in this section of the league. The other sections are Serbian League East, Serbian League West, and Serbian League Belgrade.

Teams
 FK Cement Beočin
 FK ČSK Pivara
 FK Dolina Padina
 FK Donji Srem Pećinci
 FK Kikinda
 FK Mladost Apatin
 FK Mladost Bački Jarak
 FK Palić
 FK Radnički Nova Pazova
 FK Senta
 FK Sloboda Novi Kozarci
 FK Sloga Temerin
 FK Solunac Rastina
 FK Tekstilac Ites
 FK Veternik
 FK Vršac

League table

External links
 Football Association of Vojvodina - Official Site

Serbian League Vojvodina seasons
3
Serb